Blagovest may refer to:

 Blagovest (name), a Bulgarian first name
 Blagovest, a type of peal in Russian Orthodox bell ringing. 
 Blagovest (news agency), Russia
 Blagovest (real estate), one of the top real estate agencies in Kyiv, Ukraine
 Blagovest (satellite), a family of Russian communication satellites
 Blagovest, a book of teaching of Nikolai Ilyin, founder a Russian Yehowist religious movement
 Blagovest, a journal published by Vladimir Purishkevich